Fred Marshall (10 March 1883 – 1 November 1962) was a British politician.

Born in South Anston, Yorkshire, Marshall, a wagon builder by trade, was elected as a Labour Party member of Sheffield City Council in 1919, serving as Lord Mayor of Sheffield in 1933/4. 

He entered Parliament by winning the 1930 Sheffield Brightside by-election, but lost the seat at the following year's general election.

Marshall was re-elected, again for Sheffield Brightside, at the 1935 general election. He was also elected as Chairman of the National Union of General and Municipal Workers, and from 1945 until 1947, served as the Parliamentary Secretary to the Minister of Town and Country Planning. Marshall stood down from Parliament in 1950.

References
Michael Stenton and Stephen Lees, Who's Who of British MPs: Volume III, 1919-1945

External links 
 

1883 births
1962 deaths
British trade unionists
GMB (trade union)-sponsored MPs
Lord Mayors of Sheffield
Labour Party (UK) MPs for English constituencies
Ministers in the Attlee governments, 1945–1951
Presidents of the GMB (trade union)
UK MPs 1929–1931
UK MPs 1935–1945
UK MPs 1945–1950